is a railway station located in the Higashiyama-ku, city of Kyoto, Kyoto Prefecture, Japan.

Line
 Keihan Electric Railway Keihan Main Line

Layout
The underground station has two side platforms.

Surroundings
 Kyoto National Museum
 Sanjūsangen-dō
 Hōjūjidono
 Toyokuni Shrine (Kyoto)
 Hōkō-ji (Kyoto)
 Kyoto Station
 Suzin Conference

Adjacent stations

References

Railway stations in Japan opened in 1913
Railway stations in Kyoto